Alessio Benedetti (born 19 May 1990) is an Italian footballer who plays as a midfielder for Tiferno Lerchi.

Club career
Born in Assisi, the Province of Perugia, Umbria region, Benedetti started his career at Milan as a trainee: he was the member of the under-17 team in 2006–07 as well as the reserve B mainly for under-18 players in 2007–08 season. Benedetti left for Umbrian club Orvietana for 2009–10 Serie D. In the next season he was signed by re-established Perugia for 2010–11 Serie D. Benedetti won the champion of Group E as well as the grand runner-up of the fifth division, losing to Cuneo of Group A. Benedetti made 32 out of possible 42 appearances in 2011–12 Lega Pro Seconda Divisione. Benedetti missed 3 games due to suspensions, as he was booked 11 times. He also won 2012 Supercoppa di Lega di Seconda Divisione. Despite included in the pre-season camp of Perugia, On 31 August 2012 Benedetti was signed by Catanzaro.

On 30 June 2014 Benedetti was signed by Cittadella.

On 8 July 2015 Benedetti was signed by Cremonese.

On 6 January 2016, he signed a loan contract with Arezzo until 30 June 2016.

In summer 2016 Benedetti was signed by Pistoiese in a 1-year contract.

On 28 September 2020 he joined Paganese.

On 1 February 2021 he signed with Ravenna until the end of the 2020–21 season.

On 20 August 2021 he moved to Serie D club Tiferno Lerchi.

References

External links
 Football.it profile 

Italian footballers
A.C. Perugia Calcio players
U.S. Catanzaro 1929 players
A.S. Cittadella players
U.S. Cremonese players
S.S. Arezzo players
U.S. Pistoiese 1921 players
U.S. Viterbese 1908 players
A.S. Gubbio 1910 players
Paganese Calcio 1926 players
Ravenna F.C. players
Serie B players
Serie C players
Serie D players
Association football midfielders
People from Assisi
1990 births
Living people
Footballers from Umbria
Sportspeople from the Province of Perugia